Onomastus pethiyagodai, is a species of spider of the genus Onomastus. It is endemic to Sri Lanka. The specific name pethiyagodai is for in honor of Sri Lanka's one of leading zoologist Dr. Rohan Pethiyagoda.

References

Salticidae
Endemic fauna of Sri Lanka
Spiders of Asia
Spiders described in 2010